Deep Run Baptist Church is a Baptist church located in Western Henrico County, Virginia.

History 

Constructed and established as an Anglican chapel in 1742, the church was originally named "Hungry Church".  In 1791 the church changed denominations and merged with Chickahominy Baptist Church to become Hungry Baptist Church.  The name was changed again to Deep Run Baptist Church in 1819.  During the American Revolutionary War, the church served as a hospital for wounded soldiers and was used by the Marquis de Lafayette as a meeting place.

References 

1742 establishments in Virginia
Churches in Henrico County, Virginia